The Prabhu communities are a group of related Hindu castes found in Maharashtra, India. There are four such castes, all having different ritual and social status within the caste system of Maharashtra. They are Chandraseniya Kayastha Prabhu, Pathare Prabhu, Kanchole Prabhus and the Danved Prabhu.

Introduction

The Prabhu communities are subdivided into many castes.
 Chandraseniya Kayastha Prabhu (popularly known as CKP)
 Pathare Prabhu
Drauv Prabhu  also known as Kanchole Prabhus or Pathare Prabhu Kanchole
  Danved Prabhu

Some sources refer to them by their full name but some are ambiguous as to which specific Prabhu community they are referring to. In other sources, context can be used to identify the specific caste. In some sources, Pathare Prabhus and Chandraseniya Kayastha Prabhu's have been jointly referred to as Prabhu Communities.

Details

Chandraseniya Kayastha Prabhu (CKP) and Pathare Prabhu
The CKP are considered superior to the other Prabhu communities. They are a ritually high caste and are considered socially proximate to Maharashtrian Brahmin community. Along with the Saraswat, Deshastha and Chitpawan they have been considered as an "advanced caste" due to similarities in education and occupational status.

The Chandraseniya Kayastha Prabhu (CKP) and Pathare Prabhu are considered intellectual classes (other than Brahmins) and have been advanced in education. Both have vedic upanayana (thread ceremonies or 'munj' in marathi) and their 'vedokta' or rights to study of Vedas and perform Vedic rituals has been formally approved by the Brahmin councils and ratified by the Shankaracharyas based on shastras. In case of Pathare Prabhus the formal approval was given by the Shankaracharya of Shingeri and in the case of CKPs by Brahmin councils of Pune, Banares, Bajirao II and the Shankaracharya of Karvir and Sanakareshwar Math (a Deshastha Brahmin).

Kanchole Prabhus
The Drauv (or Dhurus) are also known as Kanchole Prabhus. It is said that they were part of the Pathare Prabhu community but were excommunicated for disobeying caste rules. The Kacholes made several attempts and appeals to the Pathare Prabhu caste to accept them back. The first was made in 1836, the second and third in 1881. In November 1881, 38 gentlemen from the Pathare Prabhu community confirmed the Kanchole's "purity of blood", similar religious beliefs, similar gotras and characteristics and professions, similarity in writings, status etc. Despite these proofs they were not readmitted due to rigid 19th century rules regarding caste pollution.

Communities claiming Prabhu status
The Somavanshi Kshatriya Pathare (SKP) - also known as "Panchkalshi"claim that they were once part of the Pathare Prabhu however the Pathare Prabhus dismiss this claim and do not accept them as equals or even though the Panchkalshis do claim descent from the Suryavanshi and Chandravanshi Pathare Prabhu ancestral chieftains.

Notable People
Khando Ballal Chitnis ( A high-ranking minister in Chhatrapati Sambhaji Maharaj, Chhatrapati Rajaram Maharaj, and Maharani Tarabai Ranisaheb's court.(From the Chandraseniya Kayastha prabhu  community.)

Notes

References

Social groups of Maharashtra
Ethnoreligious groups in Asia
Marathi people
Prabhu Communities of Maharashtra